Great Duck Island Light is a  lighthouse on Great Duck Island in the town of Frenchboro, Maine, USA. Established in 1890, the light marks the approach to Blue Hill Bay and the southern approaches to Mount Desert Island on the central coast of Maine. The light was listed on the National Register of Historic Places as Great Duck Island Light Station on March 14, 1988. The light is an active aid to navigation maintained by the United States Coast Guard; the property is owned by the College of the Atlantic, which operates a research station there.

Description and history
The light station occupies a roughly  parcel at the southern tip of the island. Five buildings (out of a larger number built) make up the station: a tower, keeper's house, fog station house, oil house, and a small shed.

The tower, built in 1890, is a cylindrical brick structure  in height, with an attached workroom. It is capped by a circular iron railing, which surrounds the ten-sided lantern house. The gable-roofed workroom extends to the west. Just south of the tower is the square brick hip-roofed fog signal building, also built in 1890. A small brick oil house stands east of the tower. Toward the northern end of the property is the 1890 keeper's house, one of three built and the only one to survive. It is a 1½ story wood-frame structure, with clapboard siding and a dormered gable roof. The shed, which also appears to date to 1890, stands northeast of the house.

The station was established in 1890, a time when Mount Desert Island was becoming a popular resort destination. The light was first magnified by a fifth-order lens, which was replaced by a fourth-order lens in 1902. The light was automated in 1986. The fog station was originally operated by steam and powered by coal, for which an engine house, coal bunk, and rain catchment house were built.  These facilities were torn down by the Coast Guard when the station was automated.

Most of Great Duck Island was purchased in joint tenancy by the state and the Nature Conservancy in 1984. The station property was acquired in 1997 by the College of the Atlantic, which established the Alice Eno Field Research Station to perform research on the large bird population that the island supports. The keeper's house is used as a residence by student researchers.

See also
National Register of Historic Places listings in Hancock County, Maine

References

Lighthouses completed in 1890
Lighthouses on the National Register of Historic Places in Maine
Lighthouses in Hancock County, Maine
Historic districts on the National Register of Historic Places in Maine
National Register of Historic Places in Hancock County, Maine
1890 establishments in Maine